René Lopez may refer to:

 René López (athlete) (1963–?), Salvadoran Olympic sprinter
 René Lopez (equestrian) (born 1964), Colombian show jumping rider
 Rene Lopez (musician) (born 1969), musician and singer-songwriter based in New York City